Asota sulawesiensis is a moth of the family Erebidae first described by Jaap H. H. Zwier in 2007. It is endemic to Sulawesi.

References

Asota (moth)
Moths of Indonesia
Moths described in 2007